Erin (Woods) White (born October 27, 1977) is a Canadian softball first baseman.  She is a graduate of Iowa State University, where she played catcher and at one point held the school's career home run record.  She was a member of the Canadian Softball team that finished 5th at the 2004 Summer Olympics. She now coaches softball at Solon High School in Solon, Iowa.  Her Solon team won the 2007, Division 2A Iowa Girls High School Athletic Union State Title. Her husband, Jim White, after coaching at cross town rival CCA, made the move to Solon as the head softball coach.

References 

1977 births
Living people
Canadian softball players
Canadian softball coaches
Iowa State Cyclones softball players
Olympic softball players of Canada
Softball players at the 2000 Summer Olympics
Softball players at the 2004 Summer Olympics
Sportspeople from Vancouver
People from Solon, Iowa